Weeds  is an American dark comedy-drama television series created by Jenji Kohan, which aired on Showtime from August 8, 2005, to September 16, 2012. The series tells of Nancy Botwin (Mary-Louise Parker), a widowed mother of two boys (Hunter Parrish and Alexander Gould) who begins selling marijuana to support her family. Other main characters include Nancy's lax brother-in-law (Justin Kirk); foolish accountant (Kevin Nealon); narcissistic neighbor (Elizabeth Perkins) living with her husband (Andy Milder) and their daughter (Allie Grant); as well as Nancy's wholesalers (Tonye Patano) and (Romany Malco). Over the course of the series, the Botwin family becomes increasingly entangled in illegal activity.

Kohan serves as showrunner and is executive producer, under her Tilted Productions label. The first three seasons are set primarily in the fictional town of Agrestic, located in the San Fernando Valley of Los Angeles, California. During seasons four and five, the Botwins reside in the also fictional San Diego suburb of Ren Mar. In season six, the family relocates to Seattle, Washington and Dearborn, Michigan. In season seven, the family resides in New York City, living in Manhattan for the duration of the season, but relocates to Connecticut in the season seven finale and throughout season eight.

When the show debuted on the Showtime cable network, it earned the channel's highest ratings. In 2012, TV Guide Network bought the airing rights and provided an edited version of the show free of charge. The show has received numerous awards, including two Emmy Awards, two Satellite Awards, one Golden Globe Award, a Writers Guild Award, and a Young Artist Award.

In November 2019, it was revealed that a sequel series was in development at Starz, titled Weeds 4.20. The series features Mary-Louise Parker and Elizabeth Perkins reprising their roles with the story set 10 years after the conclusion of the original series. Victoria Morrow, who was a producer on the writing team for Weeds, is set to return as writer and executive producer on the spin-off series, while Kohan is not yet confirmed to be involved, along with any other returning cast.

Production 

Produced by Tilted Productions, in association with Lionsgate Television, the show is inspired by crime series, such as The Shield and The Sopranos, in the sense of an antihero serving as the protagonist while retaining an individual moral code, which usually goes against the norms of society. The title, according to Kohan, refers "to a lot of things", including marijuana and widow's weeds; however, it mainly alludes to "hardy plants struggling to survive". The basic premise, as illustrated by the lyrics of the opening song from seasons one to three, and eight, satirizes off-color characters struggling with faux suburban reality, in which everything is "all style, no substance". According to Kohan, she first pitched the series to HBO, which dismissed it. Robert Greenblatt invested in the show before it was commissioned by Showtime.

Showrunner and head writer Jenji Kohan, whose credits include Tracey Takes On..., Mad About You, and Sex and the City, is the executive producer of the series, alongside Roberto Benabib, of Little City fame. Kohan also explains how she and Benabib "tag team[ed]" in running the writers room. Senior writer Matthew Salsberg and director Craig Zisk also joined as executive producers in later seasons. Following Zisk's departure from the series after five seasons, Mark Burley, director Scott Ellis, and Lisa Vinnecour were added on as executive producers. During seasons seven and eight, senior writers Victoria Morrow and Stephen Falk became co-executive producers.

Exterior scenes for the first two seasons were shot almost exclusively in Stevenson Ranch, a suburban area of Santa Clarita Valley, California. The large fountain and Agrestic sign in the opening credits of the first three seasons was shot at the corner of Stevenson Ranch Parkway and Holmes Place. The name "Stevenson Ranch" was digitally replaced with "Agrestic" (and with "Majestic" and "Regrestic" in later episodes). The overhead satellite view in the beginning of the credits in the first three seasons is of Calabasas Hills, a gated community in Calabasas, California. The shot of the It's A Grind coffee shop in the introduction (seasons one to three) is of an It's A Grind in Castaic, California. The show was originally filmed at Red Studios, previously known as Ren-Mar studios. The show moved to Universal Studios in Los Angeles for season seven, where it is noted on the studio tour. A version of this Wikipedia page served as the introduction for the season five episode titled "Where the Sidewalk Ends".

Synopsis

Series opening 
Nancy Botwin is a single mother who lives in Agrestic—a fictional suburb of Los Angeles—with her two children, 15-year-old Silas and 10-year-old Shane, when the series begins. The pilot opens a few months after the untimely death of Nancy's husband Judah, who had a heart attack while jogging with their younger son. Nancy begins selling marijuana to maintain the upper middle-class lifestyle originally provided by her late husband's salary. References to conspicuous consumption are evident from the show's beginning episodes. The opening credits are set to Malvina Reynolds' "Little Boxes" song, which speaks of suburbanites from the same mold, all living the consumerist American dream. Visual and auditory references to designer labels, luxury homes, SUVs, plastic surgery, and expensive sugary drinks point to the consumption habits of the Agrestic characters. Nancy's desire to maintain her comfortable suburban lifestyle is the impetus for her decision to enter the illegal drug business and is another example of extreme consumerism in suburbia. The series follows Nancy's life as she gets drawn into the criminal system, develops a client base, starts a front to hide her selling, creates her own strain of weed called MILF, and relocates her family to stay out of jail and protect her children. Featured in the ensemble cast are her lazy, wisecracking brother-in-law Andy Botwin; foolish acquaintance Doug Wilson; and narcissistic neighbor and PTA mother Celia Hodes.

Cast and characters 

The principal character is Nancy Price Botwin (Mary-Louise Parker), a housewife from Southern California who becomes a marijuana dealer after her husband Judah (Jeffrey Dean Morgan) dies. Although her drug-dealing career achieves mixed success, she eventually rises to the highest levels of an international drug-smuggling cartel. Nancy remarries three times during the series. First, she has an under-the-radar wedding with Peter Scottson (Martin Donovan), a DEA agent, who is later killed. In season five, she marries Esteban Reyes (Demián Bichir), the fictional mayor of Tijuana and leader of a cartel, who is murdered by the seventh season. While in prison, Nancy also establishes a long-term relationship with Zoya (Olga Sosnovska), a woman convicted of murdering her own boyfriend. In the series finale, which leaps forward seven years, viewers come to know that Nancy marries Rabbi David Bloom (David Julian Hirsh), who later dies in a car accident.

Throughout most of the show, Nancy shares her house with her brother-in-law Andy Botwin (Justin Kirk). When Andy arrives in Agrestic, he is little more than a fun-loving slacker (albeit a handsome and charming one), and Nancy views him as a burden. Nonetheless, he emerges as the primary father figure in the household; her children adore him and there is the suggestion that Nancy and her sons view Andy as their last link to Judah. Andy falls in love with Nancy during the fourth season but eventually realizes his feelings are unreciprocated. Nancy tries to balance their relationship to keep him "in the family." When he is not helping Nancy run her household, Andy engages in various educational and business ventures, from studying to be a rabbi in Hebrew school, to marijuana dealer, to entrepreneurial bicycle salesman. He also has a passion for cooking, becoming a professional chef by the sixth season.

Nancy begins the series with two sons, who after Judah's death are raised haphazardly. In the fifth season, she has a son, Stevie Ray Botwin (portrayed by uncredited babies and later by Ethan and Gavin Kent), with Esteban Reyes. Her first son, Silas (Hunter Parrish), who has been sexually active since the show's debut, later follows in his mother's footsteps: he becomes a marijuana dealer, grower, and dispensary operator.

Nancy's younger son, Shane (Alexander Gould), is highly intelligent yet poorly socialized and vulgar; he is deeply affected by his father's death and yearns for more attention from his mother. In the first three seasons, Shane was also frequently bullied in school. After his peers harassed him in the bathroom for his sexual inexperience, his uncle pursues his request in taking him for a handjob at the local massage parlor. He is portrayed as having psychological issues. For instance, just before leaving Agrestic, Shane has conversations with his dead father. Upon moving to Ren Mar, he loses his virginity and becomes a temporary alcoholic. Shane also engages in violence: When he overhears his mother's conversation with Estaban's scornful boss and political consultant Pilar, who threatens his and Silas' life, Shane murders Pilar by abruptly striking her over the head with a croquet mallet before her body collapses into the pool. By the seventh season, he joins the police academy before receiving his criminal justice degree — working for the New York City Police Department in season eight.

Celia Hodes (Elizabeth Perkins) is Nancy's "frenemy". Obsessed with her personal image, she manipulates those around her who do not fit neatly into that image. She is unhappily married to Dean (Andy Milder) whom she regards as a "loser asshole"; they later divorce. Other characters also dislike her. Celia's older daughter, Quinn (Haley Hudson), kidnaps her as revenge for shipping her to a reform school in Mexico. She is also demanding over her younger daughter Isabelle's (Allie Grant) "weight problem," and disapproves of her being a lesbian. At the end of the first season, Celia is diagnosed with breast cancer and cured with chemotherapy. When interrogated by the police over Nancy's grow house in Celia's home burning down the city, Dean, Doug, and other characters falsely allege that Celia coordinated it, which leads to her arrest. Following her release from prison, she becomes addicted to cocaine, so Isabelle arranges a rehab home intervention. Celia later becomes envious of Nancy; therefore, she dresses like her. After the fifth season, the actress left to pursue other projects.

Doug Wilson (Kevin Nealon) begins the series as an accountant and city councilman for the town of Agrestic. Doug is friends with many characters in the series including Andy, Dean, and Sanjay Patel (Maulik Pancholy); all four aid Nancy's career as a marijuana dealer. Doug makes mistakes and loses his position; his wife Dana leaves him. He becomes a drifter who follows the Botwins during seasons four through eight. He and the Botwins move to New York City, where he becomes the chief accountant for a Ponzi scheme posing as a hedge fund.

The show has a changing cast of supporting characters. Heylia James (Tonye Patano) and her family — Conrad and Vaneeta, portrayed by Romany Malco and Indigo, respectively — play key roles during the first three seasons. They are wholesalers who supply marijuana to Nancy. Conrad later develops his own strain of marijuana, called MILF weed, which Nancy sells.

Season three features Sullivan Groff (Matthew Modine), an unethical, womanizing real estate developer with big plans for Agrestic. When Nancy moves to Ren Mar, the characters in Esteban's drug cartel—primarily Cesar (Enrique Castillo), Ignacio (Hemky Madera), and Guillermo (Guillermo Díaz), the latter first appearing in the third season—take a leading role. Other key characters include Nancy's housekeeper Lupita (Renée Victor); rival drug dealers; countless law enforcement officials; the romantic interests of Andy, Silas, and Shane; and the residents of Agrestic and Ren Mar.

In the sixth season, Nancy is on the run, and the new characters only have minor roles and appear for only a few episodes. An exception to this is Warren Schiff (Richard Dreyfuss), who she first met when teaching her math in high school; he becomes infatuated with Nancy. When the Botwins and Doug settle in New York City, new supporting characters are introduced. The family later settles in Nancy's estranged sister Jill's (Jennifer Jason Leigh) house in Connecticut, becoming a regular guest character by the eighth season.

Other recurring characters include Albert Brooks as Nancy's father-in-law Lenny, Carrie Fisher as Celia's lawyer, Dave Thomas as a doctor, Martin Short as a lawyer for Nancy's custody battle, Alanis Morissette as a doctor at an abortion clinic, Zooey Deschanel as Andy's estranged girlfriend, Lee Majors as a border guard, Mary-Kate Olsen as a student who worships Jesus and sells pot, as well as Aidan Quinn, among others.

Episodes 

As of September 16, 2012, 102 original episodes have been broadcast. The first season began August 8, 2005, and consisted of 10 episodes. The second season premiered on August 14, 2006, airing 12 episodes. The third season debuted on August 13, 2007, airing 15 episodes. The fourth season began June 16, 2008, the fifth season on June 8, 2009, and the sixth in August 2010, each with 13 episodes. The seventh season began airing on June 27, 2011, and, as of November 10, 2011, Weeds was renewed for an eighth and final season of 13 episodes that premiered Sunday, July 1, 2012.

In 2006, before Season two’s airing, the first few episodes were leaked online. Before the third season began, the first two episodes appeared online on July 22, 2007 (nearly a month before the August 13 premiere date). The third episode appeared online on July 24, 2007, with the fourth appearing just three days later. The fourth episode was, however, an incomplete version—among other things, some dubbed lines were not complete (notably part of a voice mail message by U-Turn is spoken by a distinctly different actor), and a card simply reading "End Credits" was inserted instead of the actual credits. On August 1, 2010, the first episodes of season 6 leaked online. Due to the high quality of the leaked episodes, downloaders of the torrents speculated that they were leaked intentionally to garner interest in the show and to create internet buzz. Episode leaks of other Showtime programs such as Californication and Dexter were seen as giving weight to this theory.

Jenji Kohan has stated that she does not mind episodes being distributed on the internet in this way, saying, "Revenue aside, I don't expect to get rich on Weeds. I'm excited it's out there. Showtime is great, but it does have a limited audience." The show is rated TV-MA for drug content, profanity, nudity, brief violence, and other adult content.

Media

Opening music 

"Little Boxes" is the opening song for the first three seasons. The first season uses the version recorded by its composer Malvina Reynolds. In seasons two and three, the song is performed by various artists. In season four, the Malvina Reynolds version opens the first episode. Thereafter, the original titles and music are replaced by a short clip, different for each episode, that relates to the plot or some scene in the episode. The song is also subtly referenced in the eighth episode of the fourth season when a sleepy Nancy tells Shane that he's going to "...become a doctor or a lawyer or a business executive." In the opening credits of the eighth episode of season seven, a woman is heard humming the tune to "Little Boxes" as she arranges knickknacks on a shelf. In Season eight, the show returns to "Little Boxes" for the opening sequence.

Season 1
 Malvina Reynolds

Season 2
 Elvis Costello
 Death Cab for Cutie
 Engelbert Humperdinck
 Kate & Anna McGarrigle (in French)
 Charlie (Charles Phelps) Barnett Jr
 Aidan Hawken
 Ozomatli
 The Submarines
 Tim DeLaughter of Polyphonic Spree
 Regina Spektor
 Jenny Lewis and Johnathan Rice
 Malvina Reynolds

Season 3
 Randy Newman
 Angelique Kidjo
 Kinky (in Spanish)
 Donovan
 Billy Bob Thornton
 The Shins
 The Individuals
 Man Man
 Joan Baez
 The Decemberists
 Michael Franti
 Persephone's Bees (partly in Russian)
 Laurie Berkner
 Linkin Park
 Malvina Reynolds (opening)& Pete Seeger (closing)

Season 8
 Malvina Reynolds
 Ben Folds
 Steve Martin & Kevin Nealon
 The Bronx
 The Mountain Goats
 Bomb the Music Industry!
 The Womenfolk
 The Thermals
 Dierks Bentley
 Hunter Parrish
 Aimee Mann
 Malvina Reynolds (Cut Chemist Remix)

Soundtracks 
The music supervisors for the show include Gary Calamar (along with music coordinator Alyson Vidoli) (27 episodes), Amine Ramer (4 episodes), and Bruce Gilbert (3 episodes). The original score is provided by composers Brandon Jay and Gwendolyn Sanford.

Weeds: Music from the Original Series
Released September 13, 2005

 Malvina Reynolds – "Little Boxes"
 Nellie McKay – "David"
 Peggy Lee – "A Doodlin' Song"
 Sufjan Stevens – "All the Trees of the Field Will Clap Their Hands"
 Michael Franti & Spearhead – "Ganja Babe"
 All Too Much – "More Than a Friend"
 Sons & Daughters – "Blood"
 The New Pornographers – "The Laws Have Changed"
 Joey Santiago – "Fake Purse"
 NRBQ – "Wacky Tobacky"
 Marion Black – "Who Knows"
 Martin Creed – "I Can't Move"
 The Mountain Goats – "Cotton"
 Joey Santiago – "Birthday Video"
 Flogging Molly – "If I Ever Leave This World Alive"
 The Be Good Tanyas – "The Littlest Birds"
 Hill Of Beans – "Satan Lend Me a Dollar"

Weeds: Music from the Original Series, Volume 2
Released October 17, 2006

 Elvis Costello – "Little Boxes"
 Zeroleen – "All Good"
 Of Montreal – "Wraith Pinned to the Mist and Other Games"
 Jenny Owen Youngs – "Fuck Was I"
 Fern Jones – "Strange Things Are Happening"
 (The Real) Tuesday Weld – "Bathtime in Clerkenwell"
 Gwendolyn Sanford & Brandon Jay – "Shane Digs Gretchen"
 Rogue Wave – "Kicking the Heart Out"
 Regina Spektor – "The Ghost of Corporate Future"
 Dengue Fever – "One Thousand Tears of a Tarantula"
 Aidan Hawken – "Neighborhood"
 Squirrel Nut Zippers – "It Ain't You"
 Gwendolyn Sanford & Brandon Jay – "From Agrestic to Las Vegas"
 The 88 – "Not Enough"
 Sufjan Stevens – "Holland"
 Gwendolyn Sanford & Brandon Jay – "Huskaroo TV Spot"
 The Mopes – "You Look Like a Gorilla"

Weeds: Music from the Original Series, Volume 3
Released June 3, 2008 as digital-only release, retail release July 8.

 Randy Newman – "Little Boxes"
 Page France – "Chariot"
 That 1 Guy – "Buttmachine"
 Beirut – "Scenic World"
 The Dresden Dolls – "Girl Anachronism"
 Ween – "You Fucked Up"
 Oh No! Oh My! – "Walk in the Park"
 Illinois – "Nosebleed"
 Great Lake Swimmers – "Your Rocky Spine"
 Mr. Smolin – "The Earth Keeps Turning On"
 Kevin Nealon – "Just Like The Superdome"
 State Radio – "Keepsake"
 Eleni Mandell – "Let's Drive Away"
 The Shins – "Little Boxes" (iTunes Exclusive)

Weeds: Music from the Original Series, Volume 4
Released June 9, 2009

 DeVotchKa – "A New World"
 Nortec Collective – "Tengo La Voz"
 Greg Weeks – "Made"
 The Free Design – "Love You"
 That Handsome Devil – "Mexico"
 Miss Li – "Don't Try to Fool Me"
 Tunng – "Bullets"
 Mucca Pazza – "Borino Oro"
 Los Mono – "Se Puede"
 Linus of Hollywood – "Thank You for Making Me Feel Better"
 The Mountain Goats – "International Small Arms Traffic Blues"
 Toots & The Maytals – "Celia"
 Soul Swingers – "Brighter Tomorrow"

Home media

The Region 1 Season One DVD is only available in 4:3 pan and scan format. The Region 2 and 4 releases are all in anamorphic widescreen. Season one was released on Blu-ray on May 29, 2007, and Season two was released on July 24, 2007. Both seasons include all episodes in 1080p widescreen with Dolby Digital EX sound and either DTS-HD (season one) or LPCM (season two), as well as extras exclusive to the Blu-ray release. Season three was released on Blu-ray on June 3, 2008. Seasons one to three on Blu-ray are multi-region discs; however, season four has been region-locked to region A only.

In late 2009, Weeds seasons four and five have been aired in at least one region B country, namely The Netherlands. Subsequently, a region 2 DVD of Season 4 has indeed been released. However, the region 2 DVD release was not accompanied by a region B Blu-ray. Showtime has not commented on whether they ever anticipate releasing a region B Blu-ray version, or if any further non-US transmission rights are agreed. The same region locking has been applied to Blu-ray for season five.  In November 2011, Seasons 2–5 were released on Region B Blu-ray in Australia with Season 6 Region B Blu-ray released December 16, 2011. Blu-ray season seven is now available.

An extra feature on the Season Two DVD (a marijuana-based cooking show parody) was rejected by the British Board of Film Classification since it was regarded as "likely [...] to promote and encourage the use of illegal drugs".

Books 
On August 7, 2007, Simon Spotlight, a division of Simon and Schuster, published In the Weeds: The Official Guide to the Showtime Series by Kera Bolonik, which features interviews with the series creator/showrunner, its other writer-producers, and the entire cast. It also features detailed character and plot descriptions, recipes, trivia and behind-the-scenes information.

Reception 
In its first year, Weeds was Showtime's highest rated series. The season 4 premiere attracted 1.3 million viewers to Showtime, the channel's then-highest-ever viewership; the season as a whole averaged 962,000 viewers.

As the season 3 began in fall 2007, Slate named Nancy Botwin as one of the best characters on television. TIME magazine's James Poniewozik ranked Weeds #9 among the Top 10 Returning Series of 2007. The New York Times opined the show is "transforming for Showtime." Metacritic scored season 2 78 out of 100, season 4 67 out of 100, and season 5 73 out of 100.

Critical reception 

The first season received mostly positive reviews from critics. Metacritic rated it 70 out of 100, based on the opinions of 29 critics. The second season achieved a Metacritic rating of 78 out of 100, based on 16 critics, and the third season reached a series-high score of 82 out of 100, based on 12 critics.  The critical reviews dipped after season 3, reaching a low Metacritic rating of 55 out of 100 (based on 4 critics) for season 6.

Awards and nominations 

Nominations

Emmy Awards
 Outstanding Supporting Actress in a Comedy Series Elizabeth Perkins (2006, 2007, 2009)
 Outstanding Directing for a Comedy Series Craig Zisk, for the episode "Good Shit Lollipop" (2006)
 Outstanding Casting for a Comedy Series (2006, 2007)
 Outstanding Main Title Design (2006)
 Outstanding Single-Camera Picture Editing for a Comedy Series, for the episode "Good Shit Lollipop" (2006)
 Outstanding Lead Actress in a Comedy Series Mary-Louise Parker (2007, 2008, 2009)
 Outstanding Single-Camera Picture Editing for a Comedy Series, for the episode "Mrs. Botwin's Neighborhood" (2007)
 Outstanding Single-Camera Picture Editing for a Comedy Series, for the episode "Crush Girl Love Panic" (2007)
 Outstanding Comedy Series (2009)

Golden Globes
 Best TV Series-Comedy (2006, 2007, 2009)
 Best Actress in a Supporting Role in a Series, Mini-series, or TV Movie Elizabeth Perkins (2006): Best Performance by a TV Supporting Actress Elizabeth Perkins (2006, 2007)
 Best Performance by a TV Actress in a Musical or Comedy Mary-Louise Parker (2005, 2007, 2008)
 Best Performance by a TV Supporting Actor Justin Kirk (2007)

Screen Actors Guild
 Outstanding Performance by a Female Actor in a Comedy Series Mary-Louise Parker (2006, 2007, 2008, 2009)
 Ensemble In A Comedy Series (2007, 2009)

Satellite Awards
 Outstanding Actress in a Series-Comedy Elizabeth Perkins (2005)
 Best Actress in a Supporting Role in a Series, Mini-series, or TV Movie Elizabeth Perkins (2006)
 Best Actress in a Series, Comedy or Musical Mary-Louise Parker (2006, 2008)
 Best Actor in a Supporting Role in a Series, Mini-Series, or TV Movie Justin Kirk (2007)
 Best Television Series, Comedy or Musical (2007, 2008)

See also
Breaking Bad
Ideal (TV series)Top Buzzer''

References

External links 

 
 

 
2005 American television series debuts
2012 American television series endings
2000s American black comedy television series
2000s American comedy-drama television series
2000s American satirical television series
2010s American black comedy television series
2010s American comedy-drama television series
2010s American satirical television series
American television series about cannabis
English-language television shows
Nudity in television
Saturn Award-winning television series
Serial drama television series
Showtime (TV network) original programming
Television series about dysfunctional families
Television series about illegal drug trade
Television series by CBS Studios
Television series by Lionsgate Television
Television shows set in Los Angeles County, California
Television shows set in San Diego
Television shows set in Mexico
Television shows set in Seattle
Television shows set in Michigan
Television shows set in New York City
Television shows set in Connecticut
Television shows filmed in Santa Clarita, California
Television shows filmed in Los Angeles
Television series created by Jenji Kohan
Works about Mexican drug cartels